The 2016 Argentine Torneo Federal A, was the 3rd season of the third tier of the Argentine football league system. The tournament is reserved for teams indirectly affiliated to the Asociación del Fútbol Argentino (AFA), while teams affiliated to AFA  have to play the Primera B Metropolitana, which is the other third tier competition. The champion was promoted to Primera B Nacional. 35 teams are competing in the league, 30 returning from the 2015 season, 4 teams that were relegated from Primera B Nacional, 3 teams promoted from Federal B. Also 2 teams resigned their participation in this season: 9 de Julio (M) and Unión (MdP) alleging economic difficulties. The regular season began on February 7 and ended on June 26.

Format

First stage
The teams were divided into seven zones with five teams (a total of 35 teams) in each zone and it was played in a round-robin tournament whereby each team played each one of the other teams three times. The teams placed 1º and 2º and the two best 3º team from the seven zones qualified for the Second Stage.

Championship stages
The sixteen teams that qualified from the First Stage played against each other in a Double-elimination tournament from second to the fifth stage. The qualified teams were seeded in the final stages according to their results in the first stage, with the best eight seeded 1–8, and the worst eight teams seeded 9–16. The winning team was promoted to the Primera B Nacional.

Relegation Stage
After the first stage was played,  a table was drawn with the thirty five (35) clubs and its overall standings with points obtained in the First Stage. The two last teams will be relegated to Torneo Federal B.

Club information

Zone A

Zone B

Zone C

1 Play their home games at Estadio José María Minella.

Zone D

Zone E

Zone F

1 Play their home games at Estadio Antonio Romero.

Zone G

First stage

Zone A

Results

Matches 1–10
Teams played each other twice, once at home, once away.

Matches 11–15
Teams played every other team once (either at home or away).

Zone B

Results

Matches 1–10
Teams played each other twice, once at home, once away.

Matches 11–15
Teams played every other team once (either at home or away).

Zone C

Results

Matches 1–10
Teams played each other twice, once at home, once away.

Matches 11–15
Teams played every other team once (either at home or away).

Zone D

Results

Matches 1–10
Teams played each other twice, once at home, once away.

Matches 11–15
Teams played every other team once (either at home or away).

Zone E

Results

Matches 1–10
Teams played each other twice, once at home, once away.

Matches 11–15
Teams played every other team once (either at home or away).

Zone F

Results

Matches 1–10
Teams played each other twice, once at home, once away.

Matches 11–15
Teams played every other team once (either at home or away).

Zone G

Results

Matches 1–10
Teams played each other twice, once at home, once away.

Matches 11–15
Teams played every other team once (either at home or away).

Ranking of third-placed teams

Relegation

Second to Fifth stage

Second stage

|-

|-

|-

|-

|-

|-

|-

|-

|}

Third stage

|-

|-

|-

|-

|}

Fourth stage

|-

|-

|}

Fifth stage

|-

|}

Season statistics

Top scorers

See also
 2016 Primera B Nacional
 2015–16 Copa Argentina

References

External links
 Sitio Oficial de AFA   
 Ascenso del Interior  
 Solo Ascenso  
 Mundo Ascenso  
 Promiedos  

Torneo Federal A seasons
3